A1 Team India was the Indian team of A1 Grand Prix, an international racing series.

Management 
The seatholder for Team India was former Formula One driver Narain Karthikeyan.

Argo racing Cars Ltd. were the Technical Servicer Provider for A1 Team India in Season 4. The UK based team was founded by David Sears and was best known for competing in GP2, and many other single-seater championships. David Sears’ experience lay not only in single-seaters, but in almost all other forms of motorsport. He is considered one of the most widely experienced team principals in recent decades.

Gordon Flynn was the team manager, and Greg Wheeler was the team's race engineer.

Yohann Setna had been involved with A1 Team India since the first season and stood as Sporting Director this year.

History 

The inaugural A1 Team India car was presented to the public in July 2005. The team did not take part in the full first season, with their last race in Indonesia. They failed to score any points.

In 2006-07, the team only scored points on three occasions, scoring 13 points total. The 2007–08 season was a much greater success than the previous two seasons. Narain Karthikeyan scored 61 points for the team, as well as two victories.

Despite missing the opening race of the 2008–09 season due to lack of available cars, Team India managed to score a podium in the final Sprint race of the season, en route to scoring 19 points.

Drivers

Complete A1 Grand Prix results 
(key), "spr" indicates the Sprint Race, "fea" indicates the Feature Race.

References

External links

A1gp.com Official A1 Grand Prix Web Site
A1 Team India Official Web Site

India A1 team
National sports teams of India
Indian auto racing teams
Auto racing teams established in 2005
Auto racing teams disestablished in 2009